The Last Mimzy is a 2007 American science fiction adventure drama film directed by New Line Cinema founder Robert Shaye. It was loosely based upon the 1943 science fiction short story "Mimsy Were the Borogoves" by Lewis Padgett (a pseudonym of husband-and-wife team Henry Kuttner and C. L. Moore). The film features Timothy Hutton, Joely Richardson, Rainn Wilson, Kathryn Hahn, Michael Clarke Duncan, and introduces Rhiannon Leigh Wryn as seven-year-old Emma Wilder and Chris O’Neil as ten-year-old Noah.

Plot
A scientist in the distant future has set out to avert a catastrophic ecological disaster, and sends a small number of high tech devices that resemble toys back in time to modern day Seattle. Here, they are discovered by two children: Noah Wilder and his younger sister, Emma. The "toys" are initially incomprehensible to them, other than one which appears to be a stuffed rabbit. The children keep their discovery secret from their parents.

Emma becomes telepathically connected to the rabbit, naming it "Mimzy", which imparts knowledge onto her. The children gain genius-level intellects and psionic powers: Noah can teleport objects using a card-sized rectangle of green lines of light and a conch shell to control spiders, but thanks to her link, Emma develops the more advanced abilities, becoming the only one who can use the "spinners", stones which can float and produce a force field. Emma describes herself as "the chosen one" but names Noah as "the engineer" without which she cannot "build the bridge to the future".

The children's parents, and Larry White, Noah's science schoolteacher discover the devices and the children's powers. By mistake, Noah causes a power black-out over half the state of Washington, alerting the FBI to their activities. The family is held for questioning by Special Agent Nathaniel Broadman. The Mimzy is revealed as artificial life utilizing nanotechnology created by Intel.

Emma relates a dire message from Mimzy: Many Mimzys were sent into the past before her, but none of the others were able to return to their home time, because they lacked an "engineer" like Noah, and now Mimzy, the last one the scientist was able to send back, is beginning to disintegrate. To save the future, Mimzy must acquire a sample of uncorrupted human DNA to correct the damage done to DNA by ecological catastrophes. The FBI do not believe them, so Noah and Emma use their powers to escape. Mimzy absorbs a tear from Emma, which contains her DNA. Via the time portal which Noah constructs using the toys, Mimzy returns to the future.

Larry, who witnessed Mimzy leaving the present, says he saw "numbers", a reference to a previous dream he had which related to him the winning lottery numbers: He had missed out before by never buying a ticket. In the future, Mimzy provides the genetic information required to restore humanity, both physically and mentally, with Emma dubbed "Our Mother" by the people of the future.

Cast
 Rhiannon Leigh Wryn as Emma Wilder
 Chris O'Neil as Noah Wilder
 Chris Sipe as Noah Wilder (other scenes)
 Timothy Hutton as David Wilder
 Joely Richardson as Jo Wilder
 Rainn Wilson as Larry White,
 Kathryn Hahn as Naomi Schwartz
 Michael Clarke Duncan as FBI Special Agent Nathaniel Broadman.
 Patrick Gilmore as FBI Task Force Agent.
 Kirsten Williamson as Sheila Broadman
 Marc Musso as Harry Jones
 Megan McKinnon as Wendy
 Irene Snow as Lena, the story's narrator.

Other characters
Mackenzie Hamilton and Calum Worthy cameo as Teenage cyborgs. Well-known string theorist Brian Greene has a cameo appearance as an Intel scientist.

Development and production
The Last Mimzy is loosely based upon "Mimsy Were the Borogoves" by Lewis Padgett (the pen name of collaborators Henry Kuttner and C. L. Moore); the story appeared in John W. Campbell's magazine Astounding in 1943. The central idea of "toys" sent from the future to the present, and of the toys' alteration of the children's thought patterns remains, but with many differences. Originally, the transferral (from an unspecified date millions of years in the future) occurs by accident. The story makes the point that exposure to novel concepts would alter the children's perceptions "naturally" (irrespective of any intention on the part of the device's creator), since it would take place during an early phase of their intellectual development. Both the film's and short story's titles are derived from third line of the nonsense verse poem "Jabberwocky" in Lewis Carroll's Through the Looking-Glass, and What Alice Found There. The adapted screenplay is by Bruce Joel Rubin and Toby Emmerich.

The film's production team also included editor Alan Heim and sound designer Dane Davis. Visual effects were created by The Orphanage, and location filming was done in Roberts Creek and Collingwood School.

Re-release of the short story

The Last Mimzy: Stories, a retitled repackaging of the collection The Best of Henry Kuttner, was released in paperback, with a new title and cover art to tie in with the film. "Mimsy Were the Borogroves" led off the collection.

Reception

Box office
The Last Mimzy grossed nearly $21.5 million in North America and $6.1 million in other countries for a worldwide total of $27.5 million,

Critical response
Critical response to The Last Mimzy was mixed, and ranged from saying that it holds appeal for family audiences, especially children. They described the story as distracting. On review aggregator Rotten Tomatoes, the film has an approval rating of 55% based on 126 reviews, with an average score of  5.8/10. The site's critical consensus states, "The Last Mimzy makes efforts to be a fun children's movie, but unsuccessfully juggles too many genres and subplots—eventually settling as an unfocused, slightly dull affair" On Metacritic, the film had a score of 59 out of 100, based on 25 critics, indicating "mixed or average reviews". Audiences polled by CinemaScore gave the film an average grade of "B+" on an A+ to F scale.

Jeannette Catsoulis of The New York Times called it, "Wholesome, eager entertainment that doesn't talk down", agreeing with Ken Fox of TV Guide's Movie Guide who said it was "a thoughtful and sincere interpretation that actually get kids and their guardians thinking and talking." Calling the film "lightweight", the Atlanta Journal-Constitution rated it a "small gem". The Chicago Sun-Times went as far as to say The Last Mimzy is an "emotionless empty shell" compared to E.T. the Extra-Terrestrial.

Critics diverged regarding the scientific validity of the film. Reviewer Susan Granger said, "There's some validity to the challenging science depicted in the film, according to Brian Greene, Columbia University physics professor, and Susan Smalley, UCLA neurobehavioral genetics professor." By contrast, Rick Norwood (The SF Site) writes, "The Last Mimzy has carefully expunged all of the ideas from the story, and replaced them with the New Age nonsense that passes for ideas these days. They have also taken a very personal story about one family and a box of toys from the future and turned it into an epic story in which childlike innocence saves the human race".

Soundtrack
The soundtrack for the film was composed by Howard Shore, the award-winning composer behind the scores of The Lord of the Rings film trilogy. Former Pink Floyd member Roger Waters also collaborated on a song called "Hello (I Love You)". "I think together we've come up with a song that captures the themes of the movie—the clash between humanity's best and worst instincts, and how a child's innocence can win the day", Roger Waters commented.

Track listing

Awards

References

External links

 
 
 

2007 films
American science fiction films
Canadian science fiction films
2007 science fiction films
2000s children's fantasy films
Dolls in fiction
Films about psychic powers
Films based on science fiction short stories
Films directed by Robert Shaye
Films produced by Michael Phillips (producer)
Films set in Seattle
Films set in Washington (state)
Films scored by Howard Shore
Films shot in Vancouver
Films with screenplays by Bruce Joel Rubin
2000s English-language films
2000s American films
2000s Canadian films